Sita Banbas or Sita ban bas (Sita's Exile) is an Urdu play by Agha Hashar Kashmiri. It is based on the Hindu Ramayana. Kashmiri originally sold the play to a local Raja in Allahabad and it was eventually published in 1928, and it was later published in Hindustani.

References

Plays by Agha Hashar Kashmiri
1928 plays
Hindi theatre
Urdu-language plays
Hindustani language
Works based on the Ramayana